The third man factor or third man syndrome refers to the reported situations where an unseen presence, such as a spirit, provides comfort or support during traumatic experiences.

History
Sir Ernest Shackleton, in his 1919 book South, described his belief that an incorporeal companion joined him and his men during the final leg of his 1914–1917 Antarctic expedition, which became stranded in pack ice for more than two years and endured immense hardships in the attempt to reach safety. Shackleton wrote, "during that long and racking march of thirty-six hours over the unnamed mountains and glaciers of South Georgia, it seemed to me often that we were four, not three". His admission resulted in other survivors of extreme hardship coming forward and sharing similar experiences.

Lines 359 through 365 of T. S. Eliot's 1922 modernist poem The Waste Land were inspired by Shackleton's experience, as stated by the author in the notes included with the work. It is the reference to "the third" in this poem that has given this phenomenon its name (when it could occur to even a single person in danger).

In recent years, well-known adventurers like climber Reinhold Messner and polar explorers Peter Hillary and Ann Bancroft have reported experiencing the phenomenon. One study of cases involving adventurers reported that the largest group involved climbers, with solo sailors and shipwreck survivors being the second most common group, followed by polar explorers. A similar experience was documented by mountain climber Joe Simpson in his 1988 book Touching the Void, which recounts his near-death experience in the Peruvian Andes. Simpson describes "a voice" which encouraged him and directed him as he crawled back to base camp after suffering a horrible leg injury high on Siula Grande and falling off a cliff and into a crevasse. Some journalists have related this to the concept of a guardian angel or imaginary friend. Scientific explanations consider the phenomenon a coping mechanism or an example of bicameral mentality. The concept was popularized by a 2009 book by John G. Geiger, The Third Man Factor, which documents scores of examples.

Modern psychologists have used the "third man factor" to treat victims of trauma. The "cultivated inner character" lends imagined support and comfort.

Literary and film references

In Geraldine McCaughrean's 2005 young adult fiction novel The White Darkness, the teenage heroine, Sym, joins a doomed Antarctic expedition. Abandoned and lost, she is guided to safety by a "third man", her imaginary friend, Captain Lawrence Oates.

In Larry McMurtry's 1985 Western novel Lonesome Dove, Pea Eye, after surviving an Indian attack with Gus, makes a trek back to Call and has an experience of a "ghost" or "spirit" that guides him during his walk.

Thomas Pynchon's 2006 novel Against the Day makes reference to the experience.

In Max Brooks's 2006 novel World War Z, Colonel Christina Eliopolis crash lands in the midst of zombie-infested territory but is able to survive and be picked up with the assistance of a Sky Watcher codenamed "Mets Fan", who is later revealed to be a figment of her imagination. She maintains the belief that Mets is a real person.

In the 2006 film The Guardian, a drowning sailor, being rescued by Ashton Kutcher's character Jake, asks, "Where is he?" and then tells of a man who had stayed with him and held him up until help arrived.

In the 2013 film Gravity, biomedical engineer Ryan Stone watches astronaut Matt Kowalski float away into space to certain death. Later in the film, as an exhausted Stone is about to give up, we see Kowalski appear and enter her space capsule, supposedly having survived. He gives Stone the strength of will to continue, and shows her a means to return to Earth, before being revealed as a figment of her imagination.

In the 1984 film, Cloak & Dagger, Davey Osborne, a child who uses his imagination to replace his absentee father, is pursued by criminals attempting to retrieve hidden data from one of Davey's video game cartridges. In moments of danger and high stress, a Special Forces agent named Jack Flack seemingly magically appears to guide Davey through the situations. Notably, the characters of Jack Flack and Davey's father are both portrayed by the same person, actor Dabney Coleman.

See also
 Out-of-body experience

Resources

 - describes how the third man factor, is produced in experiments as "feelings of presence" (FoP) - with normal persons.

References

External links
 John Geiger's Website 

Spirituality
Parapsychology